Maid to Order is a 1931 American comedy crime film directed by Elmer Clifton from a story by Doris Dembow and A. J. L. Parsons. The film featured songs from Jack Stone, Fred Thompson and George Beauchamp. Julian Eltinge, who plays the lead role, was a well-known female impersonator.

Premise 
Detective Julian Eltinge is enlisted by the police to capture diamond smugglers. After the gang's European connection is arrested by Scotland Yard, the detective impersonates her, taking a job at a New York nightclub.

References

External links 
 
 

Films directed by Elmer Clifton
American comedy films
1931 comedy films
1931 films
American black-and-white films
1930s English-language films
1930s American films